Endre Győrfi (March 30, 1920 – June 2, 1992) was a Hungarian water polo player who competed in the 1948 Summer Olympics.

He was part of the Hungarian team which won the silver medal. He played five matches as goalkeeper.

See also
 Hungary men's Olympic water polo team records and statistics
 List of Olympic medalists in water polo (men)
 List of men's Olympic water polo tournament goalkeepers

References

External links
 

1920 births
1992 deaths
Hungarian male water polo players
Water polo goalkeepers
Water polo players at the 1948 Summer Olympics
Olympic silver medalists for Hungary in water polo
Medalists at the 1948 Summer Olympics
20th-century Hungarian people